The Junior Girl's National Football Championship, is an Indian football girls tournament held for under 19 players. The competition is held every year between the teams representing state associations of India under AIFF. The tournament was instituted by the AIFF in 2001 with the first edition held at Goa.

The 2019–20 edition held at Kolhapur was won by Himachal Pradesh. The latest edition held in 2022 as a Junior (U-17) championship at Guwahati was won by Dadra and Nagar Haveli.

Results
The following is the list of winners and runners-up:

References

Football cup competitions in India
Youth football in India
Youth football competitions